Pots and Pans is the 10th Van Beuren Tom and Jerry cartoon, released on May 14, 1932 with a running time of 6:12 minutes. The cartoon's soundtrack is done by Gene Rodemich.

Plot
Tom and Jerry are the owners of a diner car where they perform their duties in time to the music - and the food can't resist dancing while being prepared. Eventually a quartet of customers join in and the resulting energy of the music sends the new shoes rolling onto an active track where it hits a real train engine head-on and coming in the opposite direction...

Notes

Tom and Jerry (Van Beuren)
1932 films
American animated short films
1932 animated films
American black-and-white films
RKO Pictures short films
RKO Pictures animated short films
1930s American films